Julio is the Spanish equivalent of the month July and may refer to:
Julio (given name)
Julio (surname)
Júlio de Castilhos, a municipality of the western part of the state of Rio Grande do Sul, Brazil
 Julio (album), a 1983 compilation album by Julio Iglesias
Julio, a character in Romiette and Julio by Sharon M. Draper

Other
Don Julio, a brand of tequila produced in Mexico
 Hurricane Julio, a list of storms named Julio
 Jules
 Julie-O,  musical work for solo cello by Mark Summer
Julio 204 or JULIO 204, one of the first graffiti writers in New York City
Julio-Claudian dynasty, the first five Roman Emperors: Augustus, Tiberius, Caligula (also known as Gaius), Claudius, and Nero
 Julius (disambiguation)